Rachovia is a genus of killifish from the family Rivulidae the species of which are endemic to the Orinoco, Maracaibo and Magdalena basins in Colombia and Venezuela, where they live in small temporary waters like ponds. The name of this genus honours the German aquarist  Arthur Rachow (1884–1960) who sent fish specimens to George S. Myers.

Species
Rachovia formerly included Llanolebias, but these are now regarded as separate genera. Rachovia and Austrofundulus are closely related, and it has been suggested that the latter should be merged into the former.

There are currently four recognized species of Rachovia:

 Rachovia brevis (Regan, 1912)
 Rachovia hummelincki de Beaufort, 1940
 Rachovia maculipinnis (Radda, 1964)
 Rachovia pyropunctata Taphorn & Thomerson, 1978

References

Rivulidae
Freshwater fish genera
Taxa named by George S. Myers